The International Medical School (IMS) of the faculty of medicine of the University of Milan is a public English-language medical school located primarily in Milan and neighboring Segrate, Italy, with other teaching clinics in the Milan metropolitan area. The school is officially recognized on the United Nations World Directory of Medical Schools. It is consistently ranked as one of the top 100 medical schools in the world. Its mission is to "provide graduates with both a solid, up-to-date scientific understanding of medicine, and a deep appreciation of the human and social complexities associated with health and disease.”

History
The course was founded in 2010 as "MiMed" in Humanitas Hospital, as a combined effort of the University of Milan and the hospital. In 2014 the hospital opened its own private course, thus the university renamed the course as "International Medical School" and relocated it in L.I.T.A. (Laboratorio Interdisciplinare Tecnologie Avanzate) building in Segrate.

Admissions
Admission to the school is dependent on a high score on the International Medical Admissions Test. Only the top 2% of test takers are admitted into the program. One-third of seats are reserved for students who are not citizens of the European Union, nor certain affiliated states, such as Switzerland and Norway. Among the incoming class of 2015, less than half the students were Italian citizens. The minimum International Medical Admissions Test score for first-round entry among EU-applicants was 50.1, representing approximately the top 2% of test-takers. Tuition ranges from about €800 to €4060 per year.

Curriculum
The school has a six-year program. The curriculum is block/module based rather than course based, following a similar format as American and Canadian Medical Schools. The first two years are dedicated to pre-clinical studies, focusing on anatomy, physiology, biochemistry, and microbiology. The following four years are clinical, with frequent rotations in different medical and surgical departments in hospitals. The school emphasizes problem-based learning, interdisciplinarity, and translational medicine. Students have the opportunity to do part of their education abroad via the Erasmus Programme. All teaching is in English. Students are required to learn Italian, and, in order to be graduated, must, in English, write and defend a final thesis. The degree granted is a Dottore magistrale, styled in English as a Doctor of Medicine.

Activities 
The first two years are mostly held in L.I.T.A, being considered "preclinical". Besides lectures, activities (e.g. Problem-Based Learning, classes with anatomical models, spirometry tests etc.) are provided to improve knowledge of critical topics. From the third year onwards the students alternate between lectures and practical clinical learning in hospitals.

Affiliate hospitals
Among the school's teaching hospitals, there are:
 Ospedale Niguarda Ca' Granda - Piazza dell'Ospedale Maggiore, 3 - Milano
 Fondazione IRCCS Ca’ Granda Ospedale Maggiore Policlinico - via F. Sforza, 35 - Milano
 ASST Centro Specialistico Ortopedico Traumatologico Gaetano Pini-CTO - p.zza Cardinal Ferrari, 1 - Milano
 IRCCS Centro Cardiologico Monzino - via C. Parea, 4 - Milano
 Ospedale San Giuseppe - via S. Vittore, 12 - Milano
 IRCCS Fondazione Istituto Nazionale dei Tumori - via G. Venezian, 1 - Milano
 ASST Santi Paolo e Carlo - via A. di Rudinì, 8 - Milano
 CAMPUS IFOM-IEO (Istituto Europeo di Oncologia) - via Adamello, 16 - Milano
 ASST-FBF-Sacco - via G.B. Grassi, 74 - Milano
 IRCCS Istituto Ortopedico Galeazzi - via R. Galeazzi, 4 - Milano
 IRCCS Policlinico San Donato - via Morandi, 30 - San Donato Milanese (MI)

See also
 University of Milan
 Ospedale Niguarda Ca' Granda

References

University of Milan
Medical schools in Italy
Universities and colleges in Milan